The Martyrs' Memorial, also known as Shaheed Smarak, is a life-size statue of seven young men who died in the Quit India movement (August 1942), to hoist the national flag on the (now) Secretariat building. The foundation stone of Martyr's Memorial was laid on 15 August 1947, by the governor of Bihar, Mr. Jairam Das Daulatram in presence of Premier of Bihar Shri Krishna Sinha and his deputy Anugrah Narayan Sinha . The sculptor Devi Prasad Roychoudhury built the bronze statue of the seven students with the national flag. These statues were cast in Italy and later placed here.

Martyr's Memorial is now situated outside the Secretariat building in Patna.

Background/List engraved names on Martyr's Memorial

During the height of Quit India Movement in 1942, eminent Gandhian freedom fighter Sri Babu Dr.Srikrishna Sinha and Dr. Anugrah Narain was arrested while he was trying to unfurl the national flag in Patna, as a strong reaction,  a group of seven young students decided to forcefully unfurl the national flag in Patna and were mercilessly shot dead by the British. Following are the martyrs, whose names are engraved on Martyr's Memorial.
 Umakant Prasad Sinha (Raman Ji) –  Ram Mohan Roy Seminary, class IX, Narendrapur, Saran    
 Ramanand Singh –  Ram Mohan Roy Seminary, class IX, Sahadat Nagar, Fazalchak(at present Dhanarua), Patna 
 Satish Chandra Jha –  Patna Collegiate School, class X, Kharhara, Banka 
 Jagatpati Kumar –  Bihar National College, 2nd year, Kharati, Aurangabad 
 Devipada Choudhry –  Miller High English School, class IX, Silhat, Jamalpur 
 Rajendra Singh –  Patna High English School, matric class, Banwari Chak, Saran, Nayagaon, Bihar 
 Ramgovind Singh –  Punpun High English School, matric class IX, Dasharatha, Patna

See also
Quit India Movement
D. P. Roy Chaudhury
Patna

References

External links

 Official site of Patna

Monuments and memorials in Bihar
Tourist attractions in Patna
Buildings and structures in Patna
Quit India Movement
Martyrs' monuments and memorials
Buildings and structures completed in 1947
1947 establishments in India
20th-century architecture in India